Samantha Charlton (born 7 December 1991) is a New Zealand field hockey player. She has competed for the New Zealand women's national field hockey team (the Black Sticks Women), including for the team at the 2012 Summer Olympics.
She participated at the 2020 Women's FIH Pro League.

Life 

Born in Wellington, Charlton spent most of her formative years living in Tauranga and attended Otumoetai College. , she resides in Auckland, where she is a student at Massey University in Albany.

References

External links
 

1991 births
Living people
Sportspeople from Tauranga
New Zealand female field hockey players
Olympic field hockey players of New Zealand
Field hockey players at the 2012 Summer Olympics
Field hockey players at the 2014 Commonwealth Games
Commonwealth Games bronze medallists for New Zealand
People educated at Otumoetai College
Field hockey players at the 2016 Summer Olympics
Commonwealth Games medallists in field hockey
Female field hockey defenders
Female field hockey midfielders
Commonwealth Games gold medallists for New Zealand
Field hockey players at the 2018 Commonwealth Games
Field hockey players at the 2020 Summer Olympics
Medallists at the 2014 Commonwealth Games
Medallists at the 2018 Commonwealth Games